Kerala State Club Football Championship was one of the most prestigious football tournaments organised by Kerala Football Association. Founded in the year 1970, it was a favourite until the late 2000s.

History 
Inaugural tournament was won by AGORC (Accountant General's Office Recreation Club) or commonly known as AG's Office team by beating FACT, Aluva.

1970's Premier Tyres and Formation of Titanium XI 
Premier Tyres, Ernakulam reached its glory days during 1970's which produced prominent footballers like Xavier Pious, KP Sethumadhavan, Victor Manjila, Muhammed Basheer and PP Prasannan. Premier Tyres were later acquired by Apollo Tyres and club was shut.

Formed in 1972, Titanium XI produced some of the finest footballers during this period. Najumuddin and Thomas Sebastian were some of the great players who represented the club during its early years.

Mid 1980's Formation of Kerala Police and beginning of glory days of Titanium XI 
In 1984, the then Kerala Director General of Police (DGP) took initiative and formed Kerala Police Football Team. The Kerala Police team of the mid-80s – when they started out – had several names who went on to make a mark in Indian football such as V. P. Sathyan, Tobias, U. Sharaf Ali, I. M. Vijayan, Santosh, Rajendran Kaladharan etc. The team, which trained at the Police Training College in Trivandrum, had a new signing soon after it was put together in the form of C. V. Pappachan, who had impressed manager Abdul Kareem with his displays initially for the Calicut University team.

Titanium XI became champions in two consecutive seasons 1989,1990.

Early 1990's Battle between Titanium XI and Kerala Police 
While Titanium XI became back-to-back champions in 1992,1993 and1994, Kerala Police became champions in 1995, resisting Titanium XI. 

Titanium XI, winners of the Federation Cup in 1993, the team had plenty of talent like Cyril C Velloor, K Udayakumar, Abdul Razak, N C Chacko, Binu Jose and Danikutty David during this period.

2000's End of Days 
Titanium XI, Kerala Police and SBI Kerala, (previously SBT) were the three most consistent and successful club teams during this era.

Season 2005

KFA- Kerala State Club Football Championships 2005

Held in Thrissur 

Round 1

25-Apr-05:

Sporting Soccer, Kasaragod  6-5 Christ College, Thrissur
(Goals S: 16 Riju; C: 3 CA George)

29-Apr-05: 

Kottayam Cosmos 3-1 Kochin Port Trust
(Goals Kot: 17.34 Girish, 44 Aneesh; KPT: 44 Harish)

Pre-Quarterfinals

24-Apr-05: 

FC Calicut 2-1 Payyanur Town Club
(Goals K: 10 P Prasoon, 87 CM Suresh; P: P Jitesh Anand]

25-Apr-05: 

Indian Navy,Kochi 1-0 AFC thiruvalla
(Goals - 47 PKM Antony]

26-Apr-05: 

Thrissur District Police 5-0 Allapuzha G. Sugunan Memorial Club
(4xShinin, Vincent)

27-Apr-05: 

Hunters FC, Palakkad 4-3 Coastal Recreation Club, Kollam
Goal + H: 22 Nawaz, 44 MB Rafi, 53 Sanu, 56 Veeravu; C: 15 Ronson, 36 Riaz,67 Bastin Simon

27-Apr-05: 

Viva Kerala 6-1 Sporting Soccer, Kasaragod
(Goals V: 57,65 VS Anuj, 63,68 Jackson Sebastian, 72 Denson Devadas, Benrajan, : 27 Suresh Babu)

28-Apr-05: 

Basco FC, Malappuram 3-1 Unity Soccer, Thodupuzha
(Goals B: 47 Abdul Qadir, 85 Ghanav, 88 Javed; U: 86 Nazir)

29-Apr-05: 

Central Excise, Kochi 5-1 Vayynad Spice Muttil
(Goals K: 28 Mohammad Rejib, 29 Anfas Ahmed, 68,72 CC Hanson, 81 VS Vijaykumar; V: 53 Binish]

30-Apr-05:

Titanium XI 3-1 Kottayam Cosmos
(Goals T: 18,39 Ebin Rose, 83 Shajahan; K: 48 Midhun Ghose)

Quarterfinals

26-Apr-05: 

FC Calicut   2-1 Indian Navy
(Goals 76,85 P Prasoon)

28-Apr-05: 

Thrissur District Police  0-4 Viva Kerala
(Goals 18,55 Javed, 25 Zacharia Akpeji, 69 Jackson Sebastian)

02-May-05: 

Central Excise, Kochi 3-0 Hunters FC, Palakkad
(Goals Shabbir Ali, Binil Kumar)

03-May-05: 
Titanium XI  6-1 Basco FC, Malappuram
(T: 15,42,44,49 Ebin Rose, 15,28 Abdul Hamid; B: 38 Ghani)

Semifinals

01-May-05: 
FC Calicut 1-3 Viva Kerala
(Goals C: 63 P Rahul; V: 19,90+1 Jackson Sebastian, 35 Denson Devadas)

04-May-05: 
Central Excise, Kochi 1-3 Titanium XI
(Goals C: 60 Bijesh Ben; T: 19,82 Ebin Rose, 66 U Shajahan)

Final

06-May-05: 
Titanium XI  2-1 Viva Kerala
(   T: 5,12 Ebin Rose; V: 51 Jackson Sebastian)

Champions: Titanium XI

Scrapping of Tournament 
Not all teams in the Kerala Premier League took part in the State Club Football Championship, which led to scrapping the State Club Football Championship for another Cup tournament.

Results

Records

Reference 

 

Football cup competitions in India
Football in Kerala
1970 establishments in India
Defunct football competitions in India